This is a summary of the electoral history of John Ballance, Prime Minister of New Zealand, (1891–93) and Leader of the Opposition (1889–1891).

Parliamentary elections

1875 by-election

1876 election

1879 election

1881 election

1884 election

1887 election

1890 election

Leadership elections

1889 leadership election

Notes

References

Ballance, John